Cassa di Risparmio di Volterra S.p.A. is an Italian saving bank based in Volterra, in the Province of Pisa, Tuscany. The bank was owned by the banking foundation of the same name (Fondazione Cassa di Risparmio di Volterra) for 75% stake. Cassa di Risparmio di San Miniato owned 20% and Fondazione Cassa di Risparmio di San Miniato owned an additional 5% stake.

History
Cassa di Risparmio di Volterra absorbed Monte di Credito su Pegno di Volterra in 1952, a bank with mount of piety origin. Due to Legge Amato, in 1992 the statutory corporation of Cassa di Risparmio di Volterra was split into a limited company and a banking foundation. In 2004, 25% stake of the bank was purchased by Cassa di Risparmio di San Miniato for €85 million.

See also 
 Cassa di Risparmio di Pisa

References

External links
  

Banks of Italy
Companies based in Tuscany
Volterra
Banks established in 1893
1893 establishments in Italy